Anuk is a given name. Notable people with the name include:

 Anuk Arudpragasam (born 1988), Sri Lankan novelist
 Anuk de Alwis (born 1991), Sri Lankan cricketer
 Anuk Fernando (born 1995), Sri Lankan cricketer
 Anuk Lawik, son of the last ruler of Zabul

See also
 Anouk